Scriptaphyosemion is a genus of killifish from the family Nothobranchiidae which is endemic to Africa.

Species
There are currently 13 recognized species in this genus:
 Scriptaphyosemion banforense (Seegers, 1982)
 Scriptaphyosemion bertholdi (Roloff, 1965) (Berthold's killi)
 Scriptaphyosemion brueningi (Roloff, 1971) (Bruening's killi)
 Scriptaphyosemion cauveti (Romand & Ozouf-Costaz, 1995) (Kindia killi)
 Scriptaphyosemion chaytori (Roloff, 1971)
 Scriptaphyosemion etzeli (Berkenkamp, 1979)
 Scriptaphyosemion fredrodi (Vandersmisson, Etzel & Berkenkamp, 1980)
 Scriptaphyosemion geryi (J. G. Lambert, 1958) (Gérys killi)
 Scriptaphyosemion guignardi (Romand, 1981)
 Scriptaphyosemion liberiense (Boulenger, 1908)
 Scriptaphyosemion roloffi (Roloff, 1936)
 Scriptaphyosemion schmitti (Romand, 1979) 
 Scriptaphyosemion wieseae Sonnenberg & Busch, 2012

References

Nothobranchiidae
Freshwater fish genera